Italy competed at the 1962 European Athletics Championships in Belgrade, Yugoslavia, from 12 to 16 September 1962.

Medalists

Top eight

Men

Women

See also
 Italy national athletics team

References

External links
 EAA official site

Italy at the European Athletics Championships
Nations at the 1962 European Athletics Championships
1962 in Italian sport